is a Japanese rugby sevens player. She competed at the 2016 Summer Olympics as a member of the Japan women's national rugby sevens team. She also competed in the 2010 Asian Games.

Tomita studied at Waseda University in the School of International Liberal Studies in Japan. She was named in the Japanese squad for the 2017 World Cup. She was cited for a dangerous tackle in their match against France.

References

External links 
 Japan Player Profile
 

1991 births
Living people
People from Okayama Prefecture
Sportspeople from Okayama Prefecture
Olympic rugby sevens players of Japan
Japanese rugby sevens players
Japan international women's rugby sevens players
Rugby sevens players at the 2016 Summer Olympics
Asian Games medalists in rugby union
Rugby union players at the 2010 Asian Games
Rugby union players at the 2014 Asian Games
Asian Games silver medalists for Japan
Medalists at the 2014 Asian Games
Japanese female international rugby union players